Troublesome Creek is a stream in the U.S. state of Georgia. It is a tributary to Long Creek.

Troublesome Creek was named for the treacherous terrain through which it flows.

References

Rivers of Georgia (U.S. state)
Rivers of Oglethorpe County, Georgia